Here is a list of some prominent Caribbean Jews, arranged by country of origin.

Antigua and Barbuda
 Jamaica Kincaid (1949-), writer, converted to Judaism

Aruba
 Henny Eman (1948-), Prime Minister
 Mike Eman (1961-), Prime Minister

Cuba

 Ruth Behar (1956-), writer
 José Antonio Bowen (1962-), jazz musician and president of Goucher College
 Fabio Grobart (1905-1994), Communist Party co-founder
 Olga Guillot (1922-2010), singer
 José Miller (1925-2006), leader of the Cuban Jewish community
 Meyer Rosenbaum (1910-1997), Rabbi and spiritual leader
 William Levy (1980-), actor in American film & TV, quarter Jewish

Curaçao
Rebecca Cohen Henriquez (1864-1935), philanthropist
George Maduro (1916-1940),
Daniel De Leon (1852-1940), socialist leader

Dominican Republic
 Oscar Haza(1954-), journalist
 Francisco Henríquez y Carvajal (1859–1935), Dominican President
 Pedro Henríquez Ureña (1884–1946), academic and writer

Guyana
 Janet Jagan (1920-2009), née Rosenberg, president (1997–99)

Haiti
 Eric André (1983-), actor, comedian, and television host, dual American citizen star of The Eric Andre Show & Bad Trip
 Gilbert Bigio (1935-), businessman billionaire of Syrian descent and Israeli honorary consul in Haiti
 Luis de Torres (-1493), one of the first Jews to settle on Haiti, and also Christopher Columbus's interpreter
 Monique Péan (1981-), fine jewelry designer
 Sol (1988-), hip hop musician

Jamaica
 Ivan Barrow (1911-1979), cricketer who played 11 Tests for the West Indies.
 Chris Blackwell (1937-), founder of Island Records
 Jacob De Cordova (1808–1868), the founder of the Jamaica Gleaner
 Leander de Cordova (1877–1969), Jamaican-born actor and film director, grandnephew of Jacob de Cordova
 Rudolph de Cordova (1860–1941), a Jamaican-born British writer, screenwriter and actor.
 Lewis Gordon (1962-), philosopher
 Isaac Mendes Belisario (1795-1849), artist
 Sean Paul (1973-), singer, quarter Jewish
 Frank Silvera (1914-1970), actor in American film & TV Killer's Kiss & Hombre, founder of Theatre of Being, half Jewish
 Louis Simpson (1923-2012), poet, half Jewish
 Yehoshua Sofer (1958-), Jamaican-born Israeli hip hop and rap artist, also a martial artist & trainer.

Martinique

Puerto Rico

Quiara Alegría Hudes (1977-), author, playwright. Wrote the book for Broadway's musical In the Heights. Her play, Elliot, a Soldier's Fugue, was a Pulitzer Prize finalist in 2007.
Sandy Alomar Sr. (1943-), Baseball player, father was Jewish but an agnostic who allowed his children to be brought up as a Catholic
Axel Anderson (1929-2012), German-born actor/director, Anderson made his debut in Puerto Rican television with a sitcom named Qué Pareja a local version of I Love Lucy.
David Blaine (1978-),  magician, Blaine is also an endurance artist and Guinness Book of Records world record-holder, American born, half Jewish.
Mathias Brugman (1811-1866), was a leader in Puerto Rico's independence revolution against Spain known as El Grito de Lares (Lares' Cry), half Jewish
Julio Kaplan (1950-), Argentina-born chess player and former world junior champion.
Raphy Leavitt (1948-2015), composer, director and founder of "La Selecta"
Ari Meyers (1969-), actress, Best known for her role as Emma Jane McArdle in the Kate & Allie (1984) TV series, born but not raised in Puerto Rico
Joaquin Phoenix (1974-), actor, won Best Actor Oscar (for Joker), was nominated for the Academy Award for Best Supporting Actor, Gladiator in 2000 and in 2005, he was nominated for the Best Actor Oscar, and won a Golden Globe in the same category in 2006 for his role as Johnny Cash in Walk the Line.
Geraldo Rivera (1943-), journalist, half Jewish New York City born
Jorge Seijo (1942-) Puerto Rican radio and television personality
A. Cecil Snyder (1907-1959) Chief Justice of the Supreme Court of Puerto Rico, continual US born

Suriname
 Edgar Davids (1973-), footballer (Jewish grandmother)
 Jacques Judah Lyons (1814-1877), rabbi, later immigrated to the United States of America
 Pim de la Parra (1940-), film maker

Trinidad and Tobago

US Virgin Islands
 Gabriel Milan (1631–1689), Governor of the Danish West Indies (U.S. Virgin Islands)
 Judah Benjamin (1811-1844), US & Confederate politician
 Ralph Moses Paiewonsky (1907-1991), Businessman, Politician and Governor
 Camille Pissarro (1807-1903), artist
 David Levy Yulee (1810-1866), US politician

See also
List of Jews
List of Jamaicans

References

Caribbean Jews
Jews
 
Jews,Caribbean